The 2007 Paradise Jam was an early-season men's and women's college basketball tournament. The tournament, which began in 2000, was part of the 2007-08 NCAA Division I men's basketball season and 2007-08 NCAA Division I women's basketball season.  The tournament was played at the Sports and Fitness Center in Saint Thomas, U.S. Virgin Islands. Baylor won the men's tournament, in the women's tournament UConn won the Saint Thomas Division, and Wake Forest won the Saint John Division.

Men's tournament

Bracket

Women's tournament

The 2007 edition of the tournament consisted of one division with four teams, and another division with six teams. The Saint Thomas Division was organized into two sub-divisions, Reef and Island. The three teams in the sub-divisions played each other in a round robin, results of the games were used to determine sees for the championship round games on November 25.  The Saint John division, with four teams, played a round robin, with each team playing each other November 22-24.

Saint Thomas Division

Reef Sub-Division
In the opening rounds, Duke beat Purdue and Temple to go 2–0 in the Reef division, The Duke-Purdue match up also featured two top 25 teams with Duke ranked 8th and Purdue 20th. Duke held Purdue to 29% shooting and won the game 53–41.

Island Sub-Division
In the Island Sub-Division UConn defeated Stanford and Old Dominion to go 2–0 in the Island division. The match up between Stanford and Connecticut involved two of the top teams in the nation, with Stanford ranked 4th and UConn 2nd. The Huskies started out strong, opening up a 22–8 lead and went on to win 66–54. Freshman Maya Moore was the leading scorer with 19 points.

Saint Thomas Division Championship Round
The Championship game matched up the two 2–0 teams, Duke and Connecticut. UConn pulled out to a 16-point lead by halftime, and extended the lead by another ten points in the second half. The Huskies ended up winning 74-48.  This was the first meeting between the two schools since the prior year, when Duke won in overtime in the regional final to deny UConn a trip to the Final Four.

Saint John Division

References

Paradise Jam Tournament
Paradise Jam Tournament
Paradise Jam
Paradise Jam